In Norse mythology, Surtr (Old Norse "black" "the swarthy one", Surtur in modern Icelandic), also sometimes written Surt in English, is a jötunn. Surtr is attested in the Poetic Edda, compiled in the 13th century from earlier traditional sources, and the Prose Edda, written in the 13th century by Snorri Sturluson. In both sources, Surtr is foretold as being a major figure during the events of Ragnarök; carrying his bright sword, he will go to battle against the Æsir, he will battle the major god Freyr, and afterward the flames that he brings forth will engulf the Earth.

In a book from the Prose Edda additional information is given about Surtr, including that he is stationed guarding the frontier of the fiery realm Múspell, that he will lead "Múspell's sons" to Ragnarök, and that he will defeat Freyr. Surtr has been the subject of place names and artistic depictions, and scholars have proposed theories regarding elements of Surtr's descriptions and his potential origins.

Attestations

Poetic Edda

Surtr is mentioned twice in the poem Völuspá, where a völva divulges information to the god Odin. The völva says that, during Ragnarök, Surtr will come from the south with flames, carrying a very bright sword:

Following this, the völva says that "stone peaks clash", "troll wives take to the road", "warriors tread the path from Hel", and the heavens "break apart". The next stanza relates that Odin is to be killed by the wolf Fenrir, and that Surtr will go to battle against "Beli's bane", a kenning for the god Freyr, who slew the  Beli. No further detail is given about the fight between Surtr and Freyr in the poem. In the stanzas that follow, a number of gods and their opponents are described as doing battle at Ragnarök, and that the world will be consumed in flames, yet afterward a new world rises from the sea, fertile and teeming with life, and the surviving gods will meet again.

In the poem Vafþrúðnismál, the wise jötunn Vafþrúðnir poses the question to Odin (disguised as "Gagnráðr") "what the plain is called where in battle Surt and the sweet gods will meet". Odin responds that the "ordained field" is Vígríðr, and that it stretches "a hundred leagues" in every direction. Later in the poem, Odin, still disguised and now questioning Vafþrúðnir, asks which of the Æsir will "rule over the possessions of the gods when Surt's fire is slaked". Vafþrúðnir responds that, "when Surt's fire is slaked" the god Thor's sons Móði and Magni shall possess Thor's hammer Mjöllnir.

In the poem Fáfnismál, the hero Sigurd asks the mortally wounded dragon Fáfnir the name of the island where Surtr and the Æsir "will mingle sword-liquid together". Fáfnir says that the island is called Óskópnir, that all of the gods shall go there bearing spears, and that on their way there the bridge Bifröst will break beneath them, causing their horses to "flounder in the great river". The late Eddic poem Fjölsvinnsmál, stanza 24, contains the line "Surtur sinn mautu" or "surtur sinn mantu" according to the best manuscripts. The last two words, which are otherwise without meaning, are sometimes emended to "Sinmöru" and the entire phrase is taken to mean that Surtr has a female companion named Sinmara. Based on the same passage, Lee Hollander tentatively identifies Sinmara as Surt's wife, stating that she is "unknown elsewhere."

Prose Edda

In chapter 4 of the Prose Edda book Gylfaginning, the enthroned figure of Third tells Gangleri (described as King Gylfi in disguise) about the location of Múspell. Third says that the bright and flaming region of Múspell existed prior to Niflheim, and it is impassable to those not native to the region. To defend Múspell, Surtr is stationed at its frontier. Third adds that Surtr has a flaming sword, and that "at the end of the world he will go and wage war and defeat all the gods and burn the whole world with fire". The stanza from Völuspá that foretells Surtr moving from the south is then quoted. In chapter 18, Gangleri asks what will protect the fair hall Gimlé "when Surtr's fire burns heaven and earth".

In chapter 51 of Gylfaginning, High describes the events of Ragnarök. High says that "amid this turmoil the sky will open and from it will ride the sons of Muspell. Surtr will ride in front, and both before and behind him there will be burning fire. His sword will be very fine. Light will shine from it more brightly than from the sun." High continues that when the sons of Múspell ride over the bridge Bifröst it will break, and that they will continue to the field of Vígríðr. The wolf Fenrir and the Midgard Serpent will also arrive there. By then, Loki will have arrived with "all of Hel's people", Hrym, and all of the frost jötnar; "but Muspell's sons will have their own battle array; it will be very bright". Further into the chapter, High describes that a fierce battle will erupt between these forces and the Æsir, and that during this, Surtr and Freyr will engage in battle "and there will be a harsh conflict before Freyr falls". High adds that the cause of Freyr's death will be that Freyr is lacking "the good sword" that he once gave his servant Skírnir.

As foretold by High further into chapter 51 Gylfaginning, Once Heimdallr and Loki fight (and mutually kill one another), Surtr "will fling fire over the earth and burn the whole world". High quotes ten stanzas from Völuspá in support, and then proceeds to describe the rebirth and new fertility of the reborn world, and the survivors of Ragnarök, including various gods and the two humans named Líf and Lífthrasir that will have hid from  "Surtr's fire" in the wood Hoddmímis holt.

In the Epilogue section of the book Skáldskaparmál, a euhemerized monologue states that "what they called Surt's fire was when Troy burned". In chapter 2, a work by the skald Eyvindr skáldaspillir is quoted that mentions "Surt's deep vales", using the name Surtr as a common noun for a jötunn, with "deep vales" referring to the depths of the mountains (specifically Hnitbjorg).

Theories

Scholar Rudolf Simek theorizes that "the concept of Surtr is undoubtedly old", citing examples of Surtr being mentioned in works by the 10th century skalds Eyvindr skáldaspillir and Hallfreðr vandræðaskáld, in poems collected in the Poetic Edda, and that the name of the volcanic caves Surtshellir in western Iceland was already recorded in the Landnámabók manuscript. Simek notes that jötnar are usually described as living to the east in Old Norse sources, yet Surtr is described as being from the south, and that this "surely has to do with his association with fire and heat". Simek says that "in Iceland Surtr was obviously thought of as being a mighty giant who ruled the powers of (volcanic) fire of the Underworld", and Simek theorizes that the notion of Surtr as an enemy of the gods likely did not originate in Iceland. Simek compares Surtr to the jötnar Eldr, Eimnir, Logi, and Brandingi, noting that they all appear to be personifications of fire.

Scholar Bertha Phillpotts theorizes that the figure of Surtr was inspired by Icelandic eruptions, and that he was a volcano demon. Scholar Andy Orchard theorizes that the description of Surtr found in Gylfaginning "appears to owe something to biblical and patristic notions of the angel with a flaming sword who expelled Adam and Eve from paradise and who stands guard over the Garden of Eden." Scholar John Lindow states that the name Surtr may imply Surtr's charred appearance.

Richard Cole draws comparison between Snorri's depiction of the sons of Muspell and the Red Jews motif. Cole writes that "Snorra Edda is closer to the Red Jews motif than it is to Vǫluspá", pointing out many similarities between  Snorri's narrative in his Edda and the Red Jews motif in which the Prose Edda differs from Völuspá.

Worship 

The 12th-13th century Icelandic "Book of Settlements" (Landnámabók) describes the 150 km journey of a chieftain's son, Þorvaldur holbarki ("hollow throat") Þorðarson, through Iceland's interior to sing a poem of praise (a "drápa") – a ritual act – to the giant that lived inside "hellisins Surts", Surt's cave, which is called Surtshellir in modern Icelandic. Archaeological research inside the cave in 2001, 2012, and 2013 has shown that what was once theorized to be evidence of outlaws' activity in the cave – bones of sheep and oxen – instead documents evidence of Viking Age ritual activities undertaken inside the cave for 65-100 years prior to Iceland's conversion to Christianity around AD 1000. This suggests a possible cult to appease the fire giant, perhaps the first concrete evidence of worship of the jötnar, or of efforts to strengthen the gods in order to restrain Surtr or other jötnar under his control.

Place names and modern influence

In modern Iceland, the notion of Surtr as a giant of fire lives on; Surtsey ("Surtr's island"), a volcanic island that appeared in 1963 in Vestmannaeyjar, Iceland, is named after Surtr much like Surtshellir. The description found in Gylfaginning of Surtr guarding the frontier of Múspell is depicted in John Charles Dollman's painting The Giant with the Flaming Sword. Surtur, a natural satellite of the planet Saturn, and Surt, a volcano on the planet Jupiter's moon Io, are both named after him, as is a Jupiter-sized planet that orbits a dwarf star named Muspelheim in 2019.
 
Surtr was adapted as a character by Marvel Comics, first appearing in Journey into Mystery #97 (October 1963). Surtur made his film debut in the 2017 MCU film Thor: Ragnarok. A female operator in the mobile video game Arknights is named after the giant, and is regarded as one of the most powerful units in the game. Surtr also appears as the main antagonist in Book II and as a playable character in Fire Emblem Heroes, voiced by Kirk Thornton, (though in-game, he is uncredited). Also, Surt appears in the Persona games and the Shin Megami Tensei games. In Persona 3, he appears as the strongest Persona of the Magician Arcana. In Persona 4, Surtr primarily specialises in Fire magic and can learn one of the most powerful Fire spells in the game, Ragnarok, which does Severe Fire damage to an opponent. The other strongest Fire spell is Yukiko's Burning Petals. In Persona 5, it and Mada can learn the two strongest Fire moves in the game, Inferno and Blazing Hell. He will be a playable evil in SMITE as the first god of Season 10, in which his season is the Season of Monsters.

Notes

References

 Bellows, Henry Adams (Trans.) (2004). The Poetic Edda: The Mythological Poems. Courier Dover Publications. 
 Davidson, H. R. Ellis (1990). Gods and Myths of Northern Europe. Penguin Books. 
 Dronke, Ursula (Trans.) (1997). The Poetic Edda: Volume II: Mythological Poems. Oxford University Press. 
 Faulkes, Anthony (Trans.) (1995). Edda. Everyman. 
 Hollander, Lee M. (Trans.) (1962). The Poetic Edda. 2nd ed. University of Texas Press. 
 Larrington, Carolyne (Trans.) (1999). The Poetic Edda. Oxford World's Classics. 
 Lindow, John (2001). Norse Mythology: A Guide to the Gods, Heroes, Rituals, and Beliefs. Oxford University Press. 
 Orchard, Andy (1997). Dictionary of Norse Myth and Legend. Cassell. 
 Phillpotts, Bertha (1905). "Surt" in Arkiv för Nordisk Filologi, volume 21, pp. 14 ff.
 Simek, Rudolf (2007). Dictionary of Northern Mythology. Translated by Angela Hall. D.S. Brewer.

External links

Jötnar
Volcano gods